Mazenod is a hamlet in the Rural Municipality of Sutton No. 103, Saskatchewan, Canada. It is part of a region of wider French Catholic settlement centered around the town of Gravelbourg. The hamlet bears the name of Father Eugène de Mazenod, founder of the Missionary Oblates of Mary Immaculate, a religious order active in the settlement of Western Canada.

The hamlet is located 93 km southwest of the City of Moose Jaw on highway 43.

History 
Prior to January 1, 2002, Mazenod was incorporated as a village, and was restructured as a hamlet under the jurisdiction of the R.M. of Sutton on that date.

Demographics 

Notable people

 Frank Fletcher Hamilton
 Jim MacNeill

See also

List of communities in Saskatchewan
Hamlets of Saskatchewan

References

Sutton No. 103, Saskatchewan
Designated places in Saskatchewan
Former villages in Saskatchewan
Unincorporated communities in Saskatchewan
Populated places disestablished in 2002
Division No. 3, Saskatchewan